Rhizobium rhizogenes (formerly Agrobacterium rhizogenes) is a Gram-negative soil bacterium that produces hairy root disease in dicotyledonous plants. R. rhizogenes induces the formation of proliferative multiple-branched adventitious roots at the site of infection, so-called 'hairy roots'. It also induces galls.

In the rhizosphere, plants may suffer from wounds by soil pathogens or other sources. This leads to the secretion of phenolic compounds like acetosyringone which have chemotactic effects that attract the bacteria. Under such conditions, certain bacterial genes are turned on leading to the transfer of its T-DNA from its root-inducing plasmid (Ri plasmid) into the plant through the wound. After integration and expression, in vitro or under natural conditions, the hairy root phenotype is observed, which typically includes overdevelopment of a root system that is not completely geotropic, and altered (wrinkled) leaf morphology, if leaves are present. R. rhizogenes also propagates as a seed-borne pathogen.

Bacterial genes may be retained within the plant.

The hairy roots are grown in vitro in bioreactors to study their soil interaction with other pathogens like fungi and nematodes. This technique has also led to the commercial production of certain metabolic compounds that the plant is known to secrete, especially in regard to the medicinal plants that are difficult to cultivate in sufficient quantities by other means. The root cultures are also used for genetic engineering.

References

Rhizobiaceae
Bacteria described in 2001